Joseph-Jean Raikem or Jean-Joseph Raikem (Liege, 28 April 1787 – 24 January 1875) was a Roman Catholic Belgian politician, member of the National Congress of Belgium, president of the Chamber of Representatives, magistrate and historian.

Life

National Congres

Kingdom of Belgium

Works
 Discours prononcés à l'audience de rentrée de la Cour de 1833 à 1866 par le procureur général J. J. Raikem.
 Rapport sur l'organisation judiciaire, par J. J. Raikem, ministre de la Justice, Brussel, 1831.
 (with M.-L. Polain and others), Coutumes du pays de Liège, Luik, vol I, 1870; Vol. II, 1873; Vol. III 1884.
 Quelques événements du temps de Notger, Liège, 1870.

Bibliography
 Léon COLLINET, Le Procureur général Raikem ; notice biographique, Luik, 1875.
 Th. JUSTE, Notices biographiques: Jean-Joseph Raikem, etc., Brussel, 1876, p. 1–25.
 U. ERNST, Discours prononcé à la séance de rentrée de la Cour en 1875, Luik, 1875.
 Fr. DU BUS, Physionomie du Congrès national, Brussel, 1930.
 Ch. DU BUS DE WARNAFFE, Au temps de l'unionisme, Doornik, 1944.
 U. ERNST, Les officiers de justice au pays de Liège, Luik, 1875.
 J. GARSOU, Lettres de J.-J. Raikem (1830–1831), in: La Revue générale, 1938, p. 230–262.
 P. HANQUET, J.-J. Raikem, in: Les Gens de robe liégeois et la Révolution de 1830, Luik, 1931, p. 159–190.
 J. GARSOU, Lettres inédites de J.-J. Raikem à sa femme, février-mars 1839, in: La Vie Wallonne, 1938, p. 293–304.
 E. HUYTTENS, Discussions du Congrès national de Belgique 1830–1831, vol. I – IV, Brussel, 1844.
 R. WARLOMONT, Raikem (1787–1875), in: Journal des Tribunaux, 1964, p. 176.
 Armand FRESON, Jean-Joseph Raikem, in: Biographie nationale de Belgique, vol. XVIII, 1905, col. 599–601
 R. WARLOMONT, Jean-Joseph Raikem, in: Biographie nationale de Belgique, vol. XXXIII, 1965, col. 617–622)

External links
 Jean-Joseph Raikem in ODIS - Online Database for Intermediary Structures  

|-

|-

|-

1787 births
1875 deaths
19th-century Belgian historians
Presidents of the Chamber of Representatives (Belgium)
Members of the National Congress of Belgium
Politicians from Liège
Belgian Ministers of Justice